Volcanic is an adjective used for things and concepts related to volcanos.

It may also refer to:

Places and geography
 Volcanic City, British Columbia
 Volcanic Hills (California)
 Volcanic Hills (Nevada)
 Volcanic Legacy Scenic Byway, an American National Scenic Byway

People
 Volcanic Brown, one of the many nicknames of Robert Allan Brown, a Canadian mining prospector and speculator

Other uses
 Volcanic Repeating Arms, a 19th-century firearms company
 Volcanic Sorrel (Oxalis spiralis)

See also
 Volcan (disambiguation)
 Volcano (disambiguation)
 Vulcan (disambiguation)
 Vulkan (disambiguation)